Scholars have attempted to reconstruct the phonology of Old Chinese from documentary evidence.  Although the writing system does not describe sounds directly, shared phonetic components of the most ancient Chinese characters are believed to link words that were pronounced similarly at that time.  The oldest surviving Chinese verse, in the Classic of Poetry (Shijing), shows which words rhymed in that period.  Scholars have compared these bodies of contemporary evidence with the much later Middle Chinese reading pronunciations listed in the Qieyun rime dictionary published in 601 AD, though this falls short of a phonemic analysis.  Supplementary evidence has been drawn from cognates in other Sino-Tibetan languages and in Min Chinese, which split off before the Middle Chinese period, Chinese transcriptions of foreign names, and early borrowings from and by neighbouring languages such as Hmong–Mien, Tai and Tocharian languages.

Although many details are disputed, most recent reconstructions agree on the basic structure.  It is generally agreed that Old Chinese differed from Middle Chinese in lacking retroflex and palatal obstruents but having initial consonant clusters of some sort, and in having voiceless sonorants.  Most recent reconstructions also posit consonant clusters at the end of the syllable, developing into tone distinctions in Middle Chinese.

Syllable structure 

Although many details are still disputed, recent formulations are in substantial agreement on the core issues.
For example, the Old Chinese initial consonants recognized by Li Fang-Kuei and William Baxter are given below, with Baxter's (mostly tentative) additions given in parentheses:

 an optional medial ,
 an optional medial  or (in some reconstructions) some other representation of a distinction between "type-A" and "type-B" syllables,
 one of six vowels:

In such systems, Old Chinese has no tones; the rising and departing tones of Middle Chinese are treated as reflexes of the Old Chinese post-codas.

Initials 
The primary sources of evidence for the reconstruction of the Old Chinese initials are medieval rhyme dictionaries and phonetic clues in the Chinese script.

Middle Chinese initials 
The reconstruction of Old Chinese often starts from "Early Middle Chinese", the phonological system of the Qieyun, a rhyme dictionary published in 601, with many revisions and expansions over the following centuries.
According to its preface, the Qieyun did not record a single contemporary dialect, but set out to codify the pronunciations of characters to be used when reading the classics, incorporating distinctions made in different parts of China at the time (a diasystem).
These dictionaries indicated pronunciation using the fanqie method, dividing a syllable into an initial consonant and the rest, called the final.
Rhyme tables from the Song dynasty contain a sophisticated feature analysis of the Qieyun initials and finals, though not a full phonemic analysis.
Moreover, they were influenced by the different pronunciations of that later period.
Scholars have attempted to determine the phonetic content of the various distinctions by examining pronunciations in modern varieties and loans in Japanese, Korean and Vietnamese (the Sinoxenic materials), but many details regarding the finals are still disputed.

The Qieyun distinguishes the following initials, each traditionally named with an exemplary word and classified according to the rhyme table analysis:

By studying sound glosses given by Eastern Han authors, the Qing philologist Qian Daxin discovered that the Middle Chinese dental and retroflex stop series were not distinguished at that time.
The resulting inventory of 32 initials (omitting the rare initial ) is still used by some scholars within China, such as He Jiuying.
Early in the 20th century, Huang Kan identified 19 Middle Chinese initials that occurred with a wide range of finals, calling them the "original ancient initials", from which the other initials were secondary developments:

Evidence from phonetic series 

Although the Chinese writing system is not alphabetic, comparison of words whose characters share a phonetic element (a phonetic series) yields much information about pronunciation.
Often the characters in a phonetic series are still pronounced alike, as in the character  (zhōng, 'middle'), which was adapted to write the words chōng ('pour') and zhōng ('loyal').
In other cases the words in a phonetic series have very different sounds in any known variety of Chinese, but are assumed to have been similar at the time the characters were chosen.

A key principle, first proposed by the Swedish sinologist Bernhard Karlgren, holds that the initials of words written with the same phonetic component had a common point of articulation in Old Chinese.
For example, since Middle Chinese dentals and retroflex stops occur together in phonetic series, they are traced to a single Old Chinese dental series, with the retroflex stops conditioned by an Old Chinese medial .
The Middle Chinese dental sibilants and retroflex sibilants also occur interchangeably in phonetic series, and are similarly traced to a single Old Chinese sibilant series, with the retroflex sibilants conditioned by the Old Chinese medial .

However, there are several cases where quite different Middle Chinese initials appear together in a phonetic series.
Karlgren and subsequent workers have proposed either additional Old Chinese consonants or initial consonant clusters in such cases.
For example, the Middle Chinese palatal sibilants appear in two distinct kinds of series, with dentals and with velars:
  tśjəu (< ) 'cycle; Zhou dynasty',  tieu (< ) 'carve' and  dieu (< ) 'adjust'
  tśjäi- (< ) 'cut out' and  kjäi- (< ) 'mad dog'
It is believed that the palatals arose from dentals and velars followed by an Old Chinese medial , unless the medial  was also present.
While all such dentals were palatalized, the conditions for palatalization of velars are only partly understood (see Medials below).

Similarly, it is proposed that the  medial could occur after labials and velars, complementing the instances proposed as sources of Middle Chinese retroflex dentals and sibilants, to account for such connections as:
  pjet (< ) 'writing pencil' and  ljwet (< ) 'law; rule'
  kam (< ) 'look at' and  lâm (< ) 'indigo'
Thus the Middle Chinese lateral l- is believed to reflect Old Chinese .
  dwât (< ) and thwât (< ) 'peel off',  jwät (< ) 'pleased' and  śjwät (< OC ) 'speak'
This treatment of the Old Chinese liquids is further supported by Tibeto-Burman cognates and by transcription evidence.
Traces of the earlier liquids are also found in the divergent Waxiang dialect of western Hunan.

  mək 'ink' and  xək (< ) 'black'
  nân 'difficult' and  thân (< ) 'foreshore'
  ngjak 'cruel' and  xjak (< ) 'to ridicule'

Clusters  and so on are proposed (following Karlgren) for alternations of Middle Chinese nasals and s- such as
  ńźjwo (< ) 'resemble' and  sjwo- (< ) 'raw silk'

Back initials 
The Song dynasty rhyme tables classified Qieyun syllables as either "open" ( kāi) or "closed" ( hé), with the latter believed to indicate a medial -w- or lip rounding.
This medial was unevenly distributed, being distinctive only after velar and laryngeal initials or before -ai, -an or -at.
This is taken (following André-Georges Haudricourt and Sergei Yakhontov) to indicate that Old Chinese had labiovelar and labiolaryngeal initials but no labiovelar medial.
The remaining occurrences of Middle Chinese -w- are believed to result from breaking of a back vowel before these codas (see Vowels below).

As Middle Chinese g- occurs only in palatal environments, Li attempted to derive both g- and ɣ- from Old Chinese , but had to assume irregular developments in some cases. Li Rong showed that several words with Middle Chinese initial ɣ- were distinguished in modern Min dialects. For example,  'thick' and  'after' were both ɣəu: in Middle Chinese, but have velar and zero initials respectively in several Min dialects.

Pan Wuyun has proposed a revision of the above scheme to account for the fact that Middle Chinese glottal stop and laryngeal fricatives occurred together in phonetic series, unlike dental stops and fricatives, which were usually separated.

Evidence from Min Chinese 
Modern Min dialects, particularly those of northwest Fujian, show reflexes of distinctions not reflected in Middle Chinese.
For example, the following dental initials have been identified in reconstructed proto-Min:

Other points of articulation show similar distinctions within stops and nasals.
Proto-Min voicing is inferred from the development of Min tones, but the phonetic values of the initials are otherwise uncertain.
The sounds indicated as *-t, *-d, etc. are known as "softened stops" due to their reflexes in Jianyang and nearby Min varieties in northwestern Fujian, where they appear as fricatives or approximants (e.g.  < *-p *-t *-k in Jianyang) or are missing entirely, while the non-softened variants appear as stops.  Evidence from early loans into Yao languages suggests that the softened stops were prenasalized.

These distinctions are assumed by most workers to date from the Old Chinese period, but they are not reflected in the widely accepted inventory of Old Chinese initials given above.
For example, although Old Chinese is believed to have had both voiced and voiceless nasals, only the voiced ones yield Middle Chinese nasals, corresponding to both sorts of proto-Min nasal.
The Old Chinese antecedents of these distinctions are not yet agreed, with researchers proposing a variety of consonant clusters.

Medials 
The most contentious aspect of the rhyme tables is their classification of the Qieyun finals into four divisions ( děng).
Most scholars believe that finals of divisions I and IV contained back and front vowels respectively.
Division II is believed to represent retroflexion, and is traced back to the Old Chinese  medial discussed above, while division III is usually taken as indicating a -j- medial.
Since Karlgren, many scholars have projected this medial (but not -w-) back onto Old Chinese.
The following table shows Baxter's account of the Old Chinese initials and medials leading to the combinations of initial and final types found in Early Middle Chinese.

Columns III-3 and III-4 represent the chóngniǔ distinction among some syllables with division-III finals, which are placed in rows 3 or 4 of the Song dynasty rhyme tables.
The two are generally identical in modern Chinese varieties, but Sinoxenic forms often have a palatal element for III-4 but not III-3.

Following proposals by Pulleyblank, Baxter explains chongniu using  and postulates that plain velars and laryngeals were palatalized when followed by both  (but not ) and a front vowel.
However a significant number of palatalizations are not explained by this rule.

Type A and B syllables 
A fundamental distinction within Middle Chinese is between syllables with division-III finals and the rest, labelled types B and A respectively by Pulleyblank.
Most scholars believe that type B syllables were characterized by a palatal medial -j- in Middle Chinese.
Although many authors have projected this medial back to a medial  in Old Chinese, others have suggested that the Middle Chinese medial was a secondary development not present in Old Chinese.
Evidence includes the use of type B syllables to transcribe foreign words lacking any such medial, the lack of the medial in Tibeto-Burman cognates and modern Min reflexes, and the fact that it is ignored in phonetic series.
Nonetheless, scholars agree that the difference reflects a real phonological distinction of some sort, often described noncommittally as a distinction between type A and B syllables using a variety of notations.
The distinction has been variously ascribed to:
 the presence or absence of a prefix.  Jakhontov held that type B reflected a prefix , while Ferlus suggested that type A arose from an unstressed prefix  (a minor syllable), which conditioned syllabic tenseness contrasting with laxness in type B syllables.
 a length distinction of the main vowel. Pulleyblank initially proposed that type B syllables had longer vowels. Later, citing cognates in other Sino-Tibetan languages, Starostin and Zhengzhang independently proposed long vowels for type A and short vowels for type B. The latter proposal might explain the description in some Eastern Han commentaries of type A and B syllables as huǎnqì  'slow breath' and jíqì  'fast breath' respectively.
 a prosodic stress-based distinction, as later proposed by Pulleyblank, in which type B syllables were stressed in the first mora, while type A syllables were stressed on the second
 pharyngealization of the initial consonant.  Norman suggested that type B syllables (his class C), which comprised over half of the syllables of the Qieyun, were in fact unmarked in Old Chinese.  Instead, he proposed that the remaining syllables were marked by retroflexion (the  medial) or pharyngealization, either of which prevented palatalization in Middle Chinese.  Baxter and Sagart have adopted a variant of this proposal, reconstructing pharyngealized initials in all type A syllables.

Vowels 

A reconstruction of Old Chinese finals must explain the rhyming practice of the Shijing, a collection of songs and poetry from the 11th to 7th centuries BC.
Again some of these songs still rhyme in modern varieties of Chinese, but many do not.
This was attributed to lax rhyming practice until the late-Ming dynasty scholar Chen Di argued that a former consistency had been obscured by sound change.
The systematic study of Old Chinese rhymes began in the 17th century, when Gu Yanwu divided the rhyming words of the Shijing into ten rhyme groups (yùnbù ).
These groups were subsequently refined by other scholars, culminating in a standard set of 31 in the 1930s.
One of these scholars, Duan Yucai, stated the important principle that characters in the same phonetic series would be in the same rhyme group, making it possible to assign almost all words to rhyme groups.

In the late 1980s, Zhengzhang Shangfang, Sergei Starostin and William Baxter (following Nicholas Bodman) independently argued that these rhyme groups should be split, refining the 31 traditional rhyme groups into more than 50 groups corresponding to a six-vowel system.

The following table illustrates these analyses, listing the names of the 31 traditional rhyme groups with their Middle Chinese reflexes and their postulated Old Chinese vowels in the systems of Li and Baxter.
Following the traditional analysis, the rhyme groups are organized into three parallel sets, depending on the corresponding type of coda in Middle Chinese.

Tones and final consonants 
There has been much controversy over the relationship between final consonants and tones, and indeed whether Old Chinese lacked the tones characteristic of later periods, as first suggested by the Ming dynasty scholar Chen Di.

The four tones of Middle Chinese were first described by Shen Yue around AD 500.
They were the "level" ( píng), "rising" ( shǎng), "departing" ( qù), and "entering" ( rù) tones, with the last category consisting of the syllables ending in stops (-p, -t or -k).
Although rhymes in the Shijing usually respect these tone categories, there are many cases of characters that are now pronounced with different tones rhyming together in the songs, mostly between the departing and entering tones.
This led Duan Yucai to suggest that Old Chinese lacked the departing tone.
Wang Niansun (1744–1832) and Jiang Yougao (d.1851) decided that the language had the same tones as Middle Chinese, but some words had later shifted between tones, a view that is still widely held among linguists in China.

Karlgren also noted many cases where words in the departing and entering tones shared a phonetic element within their respective characters, e.g.
  lâi- 'depend on' and  lât 'wicked'
  khəi- 'cough' and  khək 'cut; engrave'
He suggested that the departing tone words in such pairs had ended with a final voiced stop ( or ) in Old Chinese.
Being unwilling to split rhyme groups, Dong Tonghe and Li Fang-Kuei extended these final voiced stops to whole rhyme groups.
The resulting scarcity of open syllables has been criticized on typological grounds.
Wang Li preferred to reallocate words with connections to the entering tone to the corresponding entering tone group, proposing that the final stop was lost after a long vowel.

Another perspective is provided by Haudricourt's demonstration that the tones of Vietnamese, which have a very similar structure to those of Middle Chinese, were derived from earlier final consonants.
The Vietnamese counterparts of the rising and departing tones derived from a final glottal stop and  respectively, the latter developing to a glottal fricative .
These glottal post-codas respectively conditioned rising and falling pitch contours, which became distinctive when the post-codas were lost.
Haudricourt also suggested that the Chinese departing tone reflected an Old Chinese derivational suffix .
Pulleyblank supported the theory with several examples of syllables in the departing tone being used to transcribe foreign words ending in -s into Chinese.

Pulleyblank took Haudricourt's suggestion to its logical conclusion, proposing that the Chinese rising tone had also arisen from a final glottal stop.
Mei Tsu-lin supported this theory with evidence from early transcriptions of Sanskrit words, and pointed out that rising tone words end in a glottal stop in some modern Chinese dialects, e.g. Wenzhounese and some Min dialects.
In addition, most of the entering tone words that rhyme with rising tone words in the Shijing end in -k.

Together, these hypotheses lead to the following set of Old Chinese syllable codas:

Baxter also speculated on the possibility of a glottal stop occurring after oral stop finals.
The evidence is limited, and consists mainly of contacts between rising tone syllables and -k finals, which could alternatively be explained as phonetic similarity.

To account for phonetic series and rhymes in which MC -j alternates with -n, Sergei Starostin proposed that MC -n in such cases derived from Old Chinese .
Other scholars have suggested that such contacts are due to dialectal mixture, citing evidence that  had disappeared from eastern dialects by the Eastern Han period.

See also 
 Historical Chinese phonology

Notes

References 

Works cited

 
 
 
 
 
 
 
  (English translation by Marc Brunelle)
  (English translation by Guillaume Jacques)
 
 
 
 
 
 
 
 
 
 
 
 
 
 
 
 
 
 
 
 
   Reprinted by Shāngwù Yìnshūguǎn Chūbǎn, Beijing in 2008, .

Further reading 

 
 

External links

Tutorials
 "Introduction to Chinese Historical Phonology", Guillaume Jacques, European Association of Chinese Linguistics Spring School in Chinese Linguistics, International Institute for Asian Studies, Leiden, March 2006.
 "Summer School on Old Chinese Phonology" (videos), William Baxter and Laurent Sagart, École des Hautes Études en Sciences Sociales, Paris, July 2007.

Databases of reconstructions
 StarLing database, by Georgiy Starostin.
 The Baxter-Sagart reconstruction of Old Chinese.
 上古音系- 韻典網
 小學堂上古音 - 中央研究院
 李方桂上古音韻表

Phonology
Sino-Tibetan phonologies